The 2022–23 UEFA Champions League is the 68th season of Europe's premier club football tournament organised by UEFA, and the 31st season since it was renamed from the European Champion Clubs' Cup to the UEFA Champions League.

The final will be played at the Atatürk Olympic Stadium in Istanbul, Turkey. The stadium was originally appointed to host the 2020 UEFA Champions League final, but both this and the 2021 final, which had been subsequently re-allocated to the Atatürk, were moved due to the COVID-19 pandemic. The winner of the 2022–23 UEFA Champions League will automatically qualify for the 2023–24 UEFA Champions League group stage, also earn the right to play against the winner of the 2022–23 UEFA Europa League in the 2023 UEFA Super Cup, as well as earning the right to play in the 2023 FIFA Club World Cup in Saudi Arabia.

Real Madrid are the defending champions, having won a record-extending fourteenth title in the previous edition.

Association team allocation
A total of 78 teams from 53 of the 55 UEFA member associations participate in the 2022–23 UEFA Champions League (the exceptions being Russia, who are banned from participating due to 2022 Russian invasion of Ukraine, and Liechtenstein, which does not organise a domestic league). The association ranking based on the UEFA association coefficients is used to determine the number of participating teams for each association:
Associations 1–4 each have four teams qualify.
Associations 5–6 each have three teams qualify.
Associations 7–15 (except Russia) each have two teams qualify.
Associations 16–55 (except Liechtenstein) each have one team qualify.
The winners of the 2021–22 UEFA Champions League and 2021–22 UEFA Europa League are each given an additional entry if they do not qualify for the 2022–23 UEFA Champions League through their domestic league.

Association ranking
For the 2022–23 UEFA Champions League, the associations are allocated places according to their 2021 UEFA association coefficients, which takes into account their performance in European competitions from 2016–17 to 2020–21.

Apart from the allocation based on the association coefficients, associations may have additional teams participating in the Champions League, as noted below:
 – Additional berth for UEFA Europa League title holders

Distribution
The following is the access list for this season.

Due to the suspension of Russia for the 2022–23 European season, the following changes to the access list have been made:

The champions of association 11 (Scotland) enter the group stage instead of the play-off round (Champions Path).
The champions of association 13 (Turkey) enter the play-off round instead of the third qualifying round (Champions Path).
The champions of association 15 (Cyprus) enter the third qualifying round instead of the second qualifying round (Champions Path).
The champions of associations 18 (Croatia) and 19 (Switzerland) enter the second qualifying round instead of the first qualifying round (Champions Path).
The runners-up of associations 10 (Austria) and 11 (Scotland) enter the third qualifying round instead of the second qualifying round (League Path).

Since the Champions League title holders (Real Madrid) have qualified via their domestic league, the following changes to the access list have been made:

The champions of association 12 (Ukraine) enter the group stage instead of the play-off round (Champions Path).
The champions of association 14 (Denmark) enter the play-off round instead of the third qualifying round (Champions Path).
The champions of association 16 (Serbia) enter the third qualifying round instead of the second qualifying round (Champions Path).
The champions of associations 20 (Greece) and 21 (Israel) enter the second qualifying round instead of the first qualifying round (Champions Path).

Teams
The labels in the parentheses show how each team qualified for the place of its starting round:
TH: Champions League title holders
EL: Europa League title holders
1st, 2nd, 3rd, 4th, etc.: League positions of the previous season
Abd-: League positions of abandoned season as determined by the national association; all teams are subject to approval by UEFA

The second qualifying round, third qualifying round and play-off round are divided into Champions Path (CH) and League Path (LP).

CC: 2022 UEFA club coefficients.

Notes

Schedule
The schedule of the competition is as follows. All matches are played on Tuesdays and Wednesdays apart from the preliminary round final and the final. Scheduled kick-off times starting from the play-off round are 18:45 and 21:00 CEST/CET.

As the 2022 FIFA World Cup takes place in Qatar between 20 November and 18 December 2022, the group stage commenced in the first week of September 2022 and concluded in the first week of November 2022 to make way for the World Cup.

The draws for the qualifying round started at 12:00 CEST/CET and were held at the UEFA headquarters in Nyon, Switzerland. The group stage draw took place in Istanbul, Turkey.

Qualifying rounds

Preliminary round

First qualifying round

Second qualifying round

Third qualifying round

Play-off round

Group stage

The draw for the group stage was held on 25 August 2022. The 32 teams were drawn into eight groups of four. For the draw, the teams were seeded into four pots, each of eight teams, based on the following principles:

Pot 1 contained the Champions League and Europa League title holders, and the champions of the top six associations based on their 2021 UEFA country coefficients. Since the Champions League title holders, Real Madrid, were also the champions of Association 2 (Spain), the champions of Association 7 (Netherlands), Ajax, were seeded into Pot 1.

Pots 2, 3 and 4 contained the remaining teams, seeded based on their 2022 UEFA club coefficients (CC).

Teams from the same association could not be drawn into the same group.

Eintracht Frankfurt made their debut appearance in the group stage (and first appearance in the European Cup since their loss in the 1960 final) after winning the 2021–22 UEFA Europa League and, as a result, this was the first time that five German clubs played in the group stage.

A total of 15 national associations were represented in the group stage. This season was the first since the 1995–96 edition in which a Turkish side failed to qualify for the group stage. It was also the first time since the 2007–08 season that two Scottish sides qualified for the group stage.

Group A

Group B

Group C

Group D

Group E

Group F

Group G

Group H

Knockout phase

In the knockout phase, teams play against each other over two legs on a home-and-away basis, except for the one-match final.

Bracket

Round of 16

Quarter-finals

Semi-finals

Final

Statistics
Statistics exclude qualifying rounds and play-off round.

Tables updated as of 15 March 2023.

Top goalscorers

Top assists

Notes

See also
2022–23 UEFA Europa League
2022–23 UEFA Europa Conference League
2023 UEFA Super Cup
2022–23 UEFA Women's Champions League
2022–23 UEFA Youth League

References

External links

2022–23 UEFA Champions League
1
2022–23
Current association football seasons
Sports events affected by the 2022 Russian invasion of Ukraine